Zena is a feminine given name. Notable people with the name include:

Zena Cardman (born 1987)  American marine biologist and a NASA astronaut candidate
Zena Dare (1887–1975), English singer and actress
Zena Edwards (born 1960s), British performance poet
Zena Keefe (1896–1977), American silent film actress
Zena Marshall (1925–2009), British actress
Zena McNally (born 1979), English singer
Zena Skinner (1927–2018), English chef and television presenter
Zena Tooze (born 1955), Canadian biologist and conservationist
Zena Tsarfin, American journalist
Zena Upshaw or Zeke Upshaw (1991–2018), American men's basketball player
Zena Walker (1934–2003), English actress
Zena Werb (1945–2020), cell biologist at University of California, San Francisco
Zinaida Kupriyanovich (born 2002), Belarusian singer, sometimes known as Zena

See also
Zina (given name)

Feminine given names